Shut That Door! is a British comedy talk show hosted by Larry Grayson. Produced from 1972 to 1977, it aired on ATV and was seen in many ITV regions, though only one episode is known to survive.

References

External links
 

English-language television shows
ITV talk shows
ITV comedy
1972 British television series debuts
1977 British television series endings
1970s British comedy television series
Television series by ITV Studios
1970s British television talk shows